Church Hill is an unincorporated community in Tallapoosa County, Alabama, United States. Church Hill is the birthplace of Herschel W. Arant, a legal academic and jurist who served on the United States Court of Appeals for the Sixth Circuit from 1939 to 1941. A post office was operated in Church Hill from 1888 to 1904.

References

Unincorporated communities in Tallapoosa County, Alabama
Unincorporated communities in Alabama